Alan Duffy may refer to:
 Alan Duffy (astronomer) (born 1983), astronomer and science communicator
 Alan Duffy (record label owner), founder of Imaginary Records
 Alan Duffy (footballer) (born 1949), footballer for Tranmere Rovers
 Alan Duffy, a character in Food Chain
 Alan Duffy, Argentine recording artist of British descent, best known as the lead vocalist of King África dance music project